The Capt. Joseph Hinckley House is a historic house located at 142 Old Stage Road in Barnstable, Massachusetts.

Description and history 
The 1-3/4 story wood-frame house was built c. 1850, and is an excellent local instance of Greek Revival architecture. Its front facade is flushboarded on the first floor, with full-length windows. The front porch has a wide entablature that is continued around the sides of the house, and is supported by fluted Doric columns. The property includes a barn that was built c. 1827. It served for a time as a stop on the area stagecoach route, and was also home to Joseph Hinckley, a ship's captain.

The house was listed on the National Register of Historic Places on March 13, 1987.

See also
National Register of Historic Places listings in Barnstable County, Massachusetts

References

Houses in Barnstable, Massachusetts
National Register of Historic Places in Barnstable, Massachusetts
Houses on the National Register of Historic Places in Barnstable County, Massachusetts
Houses completed in 1850
Greek Revival houses in Massachusetts